Itzel Adilene Manjarrez Bastidas (born 10 April 1990) is a Mexican taekwondo practiotioner who competed at the 2016 Summer Olympics in the women's 49 kg.

A graduate of the Autonomous University of Sinaloa, she announced her retirement in December 2018.

References

External links
  

1990 births
Living people
Sportspeople from Culiacán
Mexican female taekwondo practitioners
Olympic taekwondo practitioners of Mexico
Taekwondo practitioners at the 2016 Summer Olympics
Pan American Games medalists in taekwondo
Pan American Games silver medalists for Mexico
Taekwondo practitioners at the 2015 Pan American Games
Universiade medalists in taekwondo
Universiade bronze medalists for Mexico
Medalists at the 2011 Summer Universiade
Medalists at the 2017 Summer Universiade
Medalists at the 2015 Pan American Games
Autonomous University of Sinaloa alumni
21st-century Mexican women